State Route 357 (SR 357) is a , four-lane state highway that serves as a connector route from Interstate 81 (I-81) to the Tri-Cities Regional Airport in Sullivan County, Tennessee in the United States.

Route description
SR 357 begins at a partial interchange with SR 75 in Blountville, where the road continues east for a short distance, as Airport Parkway, into the main entrance of the Tri-Cities Regional Airport. It then goes west for a short distance before it turns north just before an interchange with Centenary Road. SR 357 then passes by a rock quarry before curving around a small ridge to have an interchange with Shipley Ferry Road. It then curves back around before ending at I-81 (Exit 263), where the road continues as narrow local road. The route's northern terminus is technically in the Kingsport city limits, through it is far outside the metro area. The entire route is in Sullivan County and is a 4-lane divided highway for its entire length.

Junction list

References

Transportation in Sullivan County, Tennessee
357